Dirk Van den Abeele (born 23 July 1961) is a Flemish ornithologist, specializing in the genus Agapornis. He has written a number of books on this subject. Most of his books have been translated into English, Greek, Spanish, French, Czech, Italian and German. Since 1999, Van den Abeele is a  member of MUTAVI, Research & Advice Group in The Netherlands, where he is conducting research, together with Inte Onsman, into pigmentation of the various colour mutations in birds. Together with the Australian veterinarian Terry Martin he collaborated on the 'International Agreements for Naming Colour Mutations in Psittaciformes'. He was chairman of BVA International, the Belgian Lovebird Society from 1999 till December 2010. Since 2011 he is honorary chairman of BVA-International.

Ornitho-Genetics VZW 
In 2005 he founded Ornitho-Genetics VZW in Belgium. Ornitho-Genetics VZW is an independent non-profit organization which focuses mainly on genetics, evolution, taxonomy and the study and conservation of birds in their natural habitat. To support this research the organization cooperates globally with experts, scientists and museums. The results are published in books, on the internet and in ornithology and scientific journals.

Fieldwork
In 2009 he studied Agapornis roseicollis in Namibia and in 2010 and 2013 he volunteered for the Lovebird Research Project, a study into Agapornis lilianae in Liwonde National Park in Malawi. This research project was set up by Tiwonge Mzumara and Mike Perrin from the University of KwaZulu-Natal in South Africa

Agapornis genome study 
In January 2015 Dirk Van den Abeele was appointed as 'associated study leader' in Ms Henriette van der Zwan's (Friedrich) study to sequence the genome of the genus Agapornis at the University of Potchefstroom, South Africa.

Books
 Lovebirds (2001)
 Kweken met agaporniden (2001)
 De roseicollis en zijn mutaties (2002)
 Agaporniden, handboek en naslagwerk (2005)
 Love birds, Owner’s manual and reference guide (2006)
 Agaporniden, handboek en naslagwerk - New Edition - Part I (2012)
 Agaporniden, handboek en naslagwerk - New Edition - Part II (2013)
 Erfelijkheid bij vogels (2014)
 Lovebirds compendium (2016)
 Antologia del Agapornis (2018)
 Les Inséparables - Genus Agapornis (2018)

References

External links 
 Website Dirk Van den Abeele
 Website Agapornis Genome Study

1961 births
Living people
Flemish scientists
Belgian ornithologists
People from Wetteren